Rhythm in a Riff is a 1947 medium length musical film produced by William D. Alexander and directed by Leonard Anderson. The film stars Billy Eckstine and his band performing as well as Ann Baker, Hortense Allen Jordan, Sarah Harris, and Emmett "Babe" Wallace. The film is extant. The film was.made in New York City. It was released by Astor Pictures. The film was targeted to am African American audience, features and African American cast, and was produced and directed by African Americans. The film is also known as Flicker Up.

The film features various songs performed by Eckstine, who served as the film's hero. who sings, conducts, and performs solo in the film. Several soundies were made from excerpts of the film.

"Lonesome Lover Blues" is one of the songs Eckstine performs in the film.

A September 1949 review in the Indianapolis Recorder described the film as "jampacked full of music, pep, and vitality" and praised Eckstine's acting performance as a bandleader in search of a gig.

Hortense Allen dances in the film. She was shown footage of her performance in the film 50 years after it was made. The dancer, choreographer, costume designer, and producer said it was the first time she ever saw herself dance.

Oakton Community College has a poster for the film. The film was rereleased on video in 1993 along with some footage of Dizzy Gillespie under the title Dizzy Gillespie/Billy Eckstine: Things To Come (Vintage Jazz Classics Video VJC-2006). Clips from the film were used in the 2004 Storyville Films release The Black Big Bands

Cast 
Billy Eckstine and his band
Emmett "Babe" Wallace
Sarah Harris
Garfield Love
Ray Moore
Ann Baker, singing "I Cried for You"
Hortense Allen dancing

References

External links 
 

1947 films
1947 musical films
American musical films
American black-and-white films
1940s English-language films
1940s American films
English-language musical films